Tripudia rectangula is a moth in the family Noctuidae. It is found in North America, where it has been recorded from Alabama, Florida, Georgia, Illinois, Indiana, Iowa, Louisiana, Maryland, Mississippi, North Carolina, Ohio, Oklahoma, South Carolina and Tennessee.

The wingspan is about 14 mm.

The larvae feed on Ruellia species.

References

, 2009, A review of the Tripudia quadrifera (Zeller) (Lepidoptera: Noctuidae) species complex, Proc. Entomol. Soc. Wash. 111 (1): 68-97

Moths described in 2009
Acontiinae
Moths of North America